West Chester United SC is an American soccer club based in West Chester, Pennsylvania that currently competes in both the National Premier Soccer League (NPSL) and USL League Two. The organization also fields a side in the United Soccer League of Pennsylvania, a fully-amateur state league.

History

The team was announced on January 18, 2017 as an NPSL expansion team. West Chester is a non-profit youth organization, with over 3,400 boys and girls ages 3 to 18 and approximately 350 adult players.

On January 14, 2020 USL League Two announced that West Chester United would join the league for the 2020 season in the Mid Atlantic Division.

Since 2017, WCU has had a rivalry with fellow Pennsylvania side Philadelphia Lone Star FC, which also joined the NPSL in 2017. Both teams' first league match was against one-another and made the first leg of a derby, the Route 3 Derby, with the winner after both legs being awarded the Kildare's Cup. West Chester has won the cup every year of its existence, with the closest series coming in 2019 when United won 4-3 after initially losing the first game for the first time.

Year-by-year

NPSL

USL League Two

Honors

NPSL
 Kildare's Cup: Champion (2017, 2018, 2019)
 2020 U.S. Open Cup: Qualified
 Keystone Conference Champions (2021)

USL League Two
 Mid Atlantic Division Champions (2021)

Amateur
 United Soccer League of Pennsylvania: Champion (2015–16, 2016–17, 2017–18, 2018-19)
 Northeast Elite Soccer League: Champion (2019)
 Eastern Pennsylvania Soccer Association Open Cup: Champion (2011–12, 2012–13, 2013–14, 2014-15)
 Eastern Pennsylvania Soccer Association Amateur Open Cup: Champion (2017–18, 2018–19)
 USASA Region I Werner Fricker Open Cup: Champion (2015)
 Werner Fricker Open Cup: Champion (2015)
 USASA Region I Amateur Cup: Champions (2018)
 National Amateur Cup: Finalist (2018)
 2016 U.S. Open Cup: Second Round
 2019 U.S. Open Cup: Second Round

References

1976 establishments in Pennsylvania
Association football clubs established in 1976
Soccer clubs in Pennsylvania
National Premier Soccer League teams
West Chester, Pennsylvania